Khoiful Mukhib (born 15 December 1990) is an Indonesian male mountain cyclist. In the 2018 Asian Games, he won a gold medal for downhill cycling after scoring a time of 2 minutes, 16.687 seconds.

He was born in Jepara, Central Java on 15 December 1990. He married his wife in 2017, and she was pregnant during the Asian Games. Before participating in the games, he had won several national competitions as part of the 76 team, which he joined in 2009.

References

1990 births
Living people
Indonesian male cyclists
Cyclists at the 2018 Asian Games
Medalists at the 2018 Asian Games
Asian Games gold medalists for Indonesia
Asian Games medalists in cycling
People from Jepara
Sportspeople from Central Java
21st-century Indonesian people